Gréville-Hague is a former commune in the Manche department in Normandy in north-western France. On 1 January 2017, it was merged into the new commune La Hague. A hamlet (Gruchy) of the village is the birthplace of Jean-François Millet, a notable impressionist painter. Several of his most important paintings depict local landscapes or rural labour.

Location of a major World War II battery, as well as massive French fortifications (never completed) to protect the deep-water port of Cherbourg.

See also
Communes of the Manche department

References

Grevillehague